Swapnangal is a 1970 Indian Malayalam film,  directed and produced by P. Subramaniam. The film stars Geethanjali, Madhu, K. V. Shanthi and S. P. Pillai in the lead roles. The film had musical score by G. Devarajan.

Cast
Geethanjali as Rajamma
Madhu as Dr. Balakrishnan
K. V. Shanthi as Rajamma's mother
S. P. Pillai as Chellappan
Kanakasree as Kamalamma
DK Chellappan as Gopala Pilla
Sridevi as young Rajamma
Srividya as Radha
Vincent as Chandran
Philip as Soman Nair
Ramachandran
Mani
Radhakrishnan

Soundtrack
The music was composed by G. Devarajan and the lyrics were written by Vayalar Ramavarma.

References

External links
 

1970 films
1970s Malayalam-language films
Films directed by P. Subramaniam